The CSA One-Day Cup (formerly known as the Standard Bank Cup, the MTN Domestic Championship, and the Momentum One-Day Cup) is the premier domestic one-day cricket competition of South Africa, its matches having List A status. Matches are usually played partly under lights as day-night matches and occasionally get larger crowds than the Test matches.

History
The tournament has been played since the 1982–83 season when five teams competed in the Benson and Hedges Series. The tournament gradually expanded, with eleven teams taking part from 1994–95 onwards, as more and more teams were promoted from the B groups of South African cricket. Two seasons later, it was renamed the Standard Bank League, and then the Standard Bank Cup, but the same teams competed, until Namibia were admitted in 2002–03.

To reflect the wider structural changes that were happening across South African cricket, from the 2004-05 season the competition was re-organised to mirror both the Four-Day and T20 leagues. The six newly created, entirely professional, franchises would take part in the tournament, with the former provincial teams continuing in a separate semi-professional CSA structure. In the 2007–08 season, Zimbabwe took part in the competition as a seventh side, playing both home and away fixtures.

Domestic cricketing reforms were introduced in 2020 that discontinued the six franchise team format and began a return to the more traditional provincial based system. Fifteen teams, split over the two divisions, now compete in the One-Day tournament.

In Division 1, five of the six teams who competed in the 2020–21 CSA Four-Day Franchise Series opted to retain their franchise brand, with only the former Cape Cobras reverting to their traditional Western Province name. They were joined in Division 1 by Boland and North West. Matches featuring either Limpopo or Mpumalanga, both in Division 2, do not have List A status.

On 30 March 2022, in the Division One match between Titans and North West, Titans scored 453/3 from their 50 overs, setting a record for the highest total in a List A match in South Africa.

Winners
 1981–82 Transvaal
 1982–83 Transvaal
 1983–84 Natal
 1984–85 Transvaal
 1985–86 Western Province
 1986–87 Western Province
 1987–88 Western Province
 1988–89 Orange Free State
 1989–90 Eastern Province
 1990–91 Western Province
 1991–92 Eastern Province
 1992–93 Transvaal
 1993–94 Orange Free State
 1994–95 Orange Free State
 1995–96 Orange Free State
 1996–97 Natal
 1997–98 Gauteng
 1998–99 Griqualand West
 1999-00 Boland
 2000–01 KwaZulu Natal
 2001–02 KwaZulu Natal
 2002–03 Western Province
 2003–04 Gauteng
 2004–05 Eagles
 2005–06 Eagles
 2006–07 Cape Cobras
 2007–08 Titans
 2008–09 Titans
 2009–10 Warriors
 2010–11 Knights
 2011–12 Cape Cobras
 2012–13 Cape Cobras and Lions (shared)
 2013–14 Cape Cobras and Titans (shared)
 2014–15 Titans
 2015–16 Lions
 2016–17 Titans
 2017–18 Dolphins and Warriors (shared)
 2018–19 Titans
 2019–20 Dolphins
 2020–21 Dolphins and Lions (shared)

Current structure
The 15 teams that take part are:

Points system:
 Win: 4 points
 Tie, no result or abandoned: 2 points
 Loss: 0 points
 Bonus points: 1 point awarded if the winning team achieves a run rate of at least 1.25 times that of the opposition.

In the event of teams finishing on equal points, the top three places are determined in the following order of priority: (taken from Cricket South Africa Summer Handbook 2011–2012)
 The team with the most wins;
 If still equal, the team with the most wins over the other team(s) who are equal on points and have the same number of wins;
 If still equal, the team with the most bonus points;
 If still equal, the team with the highest net run rate.

References

Further reading
 South African Cricket Annual – various editions
 Wisden Cricketers' Almanack – various editions

South African domestic cricket competitions
List A cricket competitions
Professional sports leagues in South Africa